Fibroin is an insoluble protein present in silk produced by numerous insects, such as the larvae of Bombyx mori, and other moth genera such as Antheraea, Cricula, Samia and Gonometa. Silk in its raw state consists of two main proteins, sericin and fibroin, with a glue-like layer of sericin coating two singular filaments of fibroin called brins. Silk fibroin is considered a β-keratin related to proteins that form hair, skin, nails and connective tissues.  

The silk worm produces fibroin with three chains, the light, heavy, and the glycoprotein P25. The heavy and light chains are linked by a disulphide bond, and P25 associates with disulphide-linked heavy and light chains by noncovalent interactions. P25 plays an important role in maintaining integrity of the complex.

The heavy fibroin protein consists of layers of antiparallel beta sheets. Its primary structure mainly consists of the recurrent amino acid sequence (Gly-Ser-Gly-Ala-Gly-Ala)n. The high glycine (and, to a lesser extent, alanine) content allows for tight packing of the sheets, which contributes to silk's rigid structure and tensile strength. A combination of stiffness and toughness make it a material with applications in several areas, including biomedicine and textile manufacture.

Fibroin is known to arrange itself in three structures, called silk I, II, and III. Silk I is the natural form of fibroin, as emitted from the Bombyx mori silk glands. Silk II refers to the arrangement of fibroin molecules in spun silk, which has greater strength and is often used in various commercial applications. Silk III is a newly discovered structure of fibroin. Silk III is formed principally in solutions of fibroin at an interface (i.e. air-water interface, water-oil interface, etc.).

Degradation 

Many species of Amycolatopsis and Saccharotrix bacteria are able to degrade both silk fibroin and polylactic acid.

References 

Insect proteins
Silk